Bernardo Rogora (6 December 1911 – 9 December 1970) was an Italian cyclist.

Major results
1933
 1st Milan–Modena
 5th Giro di Lombardia
1934
 1st  Overall Volta a Catalunya
1st Stages 5 & 8
 3rd Milan–Modena
 7th Milan–San Remo
1937
 1st  National Cyclo-cross Championships
 7th Overall Giro d'Italia
1939
 10th Overall Giro d'Italia

References

1911 births
1970 deaths
Belgian male cyclists